Trie Utami Sari or also known as Trie Utami or Iie (born January 8, 1968 in Bandung) is an Indonesian singer, composer and pianist. former singer of the group Krakatau, she joined the group Rumpies since the late 2000s.

Discography
Singles
1991 – Gentil = Aced
1991 – Gimana

Studio albums
1991 – Untuk Ayah dan Ibu Tercinta
1992 – Kau yang Kutunggu
1995 – Cemburu
1996 – Mungkinkah Terjadi
2007 – Kekasih Bayangan

References

External links 
  Profil Trie Utami Kapanlagi.com
 Twitter Trie Utami

1968 births
Living people
20th-century Indonesian women singers
Indonesian pop singers
Indonesian pianists
Indonesian songwriters
Indonesian former Muslims
Sundanese people
Javanese people
People from Bandung
Musicians from West Java
21st-century pianists
20th-century women pianists